Anne Stone may refer to:

 Anne Stone (writer), Canadian writer, teacher, and editor
 Anne Stone (academic), American anthropological geneticist
 Anne Belle Stone (1874–1949), American artist